This is a list of television programs broadcast by Nickelodeon in the United States. The channel was first tested on December 1, 1977, as an experimental local channel in Columbus, Ohio. On April 1, 1979, the channel expanded into a national network named Nickelodeon.

The first program broadcast on Nickelodeon was Pinwheel, a preschool series created by Dr. Vivian Horner, who also conceived the idea for the channel itself. At its launch, Nickelodeon was commercial-free and mainly featured educational shows. By 1984, the channel began accepting traditional commercials and introduced more entertainment-focused programming. In January 1988, the network launched a weekday morning block for preschoolers called Nick Jr., which carried Pinwheel and other educational series. Around the same time, Nickelodeon began investing in original animated shows, which premiered in 1991 under the "Nicktoons" branding. Since then, the channel has consistently aired a mix of original live-action and animated titles.

Current programming

Original programming

Animated ("Nicktoons")

Live-action

Comedy

Drama

Game shows

Unscripted series

Preschool series

Mini-series/specials

Educational series

Acquired programming

Animated

Preschool series

Upcoming programming

Original programming

Animated ("Nicktoons")

Live-action series

Preschool series

Acquired programming

Animated series

Preschool series

Former programming

Original programming

Animated ("Nicktoons")

Live-action

Comedy

Drama

Game shows

Variety programs

Preschool

Animated preschool series

Live-action preschool series

Programming from Noggin

Mini-series/other

Former acquired programming

Former acquired animated series

6teen (2005–06)
Ace Ventura: Pet Detective (1999–2000)
The Adventures of The Little Prince (1985–89)
The Adventures of Tintin (1994–97)
Alvin and the Chipmunks (1995–97)
Angela Anaconda (2004)
Animaniacs (2001–03)
Bananaman (1985–87)
Beetlejuice (1994–98)
Belle and Sebastian (1984–89)
Blaster's Universe (2000)
The Brady Kids (1998)
The Brothers Flub (1999–2000)
Bullwinkle's Moose-o-Rama (1992–96)
Butt-Ugly Martians (2001–03)
Count Duckula (1988–93)
Danger Mouse (1984–88; 1991–94)
Dennis the Menace (1991–2003)
Digimon Fusion (2013)
Doctor Snuggles (1988–90)
Garfield and Friends (1997–2000)
Gumby (1994–96)
Heathcliff (1988–93)
Inspector Gadget (1987–92; 1996–2000)
Kappa Mikey (2006–07) 
Kuu Kuu Harajuku (2016–17)
Lego City Adventures (2019–20)
Lego Jurassic World: Legend of Isla Nublar (2019–20)
Looney Tunes (1988–99)
Martin Mystery (2005)
Men in Black: The Series (2002–03)
Miraculous: Tales of Ladybug & Cat Noir (2015–16)
Jim Henson's Muppet Babies (1992–99)
My Dad the Rock Star (2005)
Mysticons (2017–18)
Nickelodeon's Most Wanted: Yogi Bear (1990–93)
The Mysterious Cities of Gold (1986–90)
Oggy and the Cockroaches (2015)
Ollie's Pack (2020–21)
Pelswick (2000–02)
Pinky and the Brain (2000–03) 
Rabbids Invasion (2013–17)
Rainbow Butterfly Unicorn Kitty (2019)
Regal Academy (2016–18)
Rocket Monkeys (2013)
Shuriken School (2006)
Spartakus and the Sun Beneath the Sea (1986–91)
Speed Racer X (2002–03)
Star Trek: The Animated Series (1985–90)
Stickin' Around (2000)
Super Duper Sumos (2002–03)
Tiny Toon Adventures (1995–99; 2002–03)
Underdog (1992–94)
Wayside (2007–08)
Yakkity Yak (2003–04)
You're on Nickelodeon, Charlie Brown (1998–2000)

Former acquired live-action comedy series

America's Funniest Home Videos (2007)
Batman (2002)
The Brady Bunch (1998–2001)
Camp Runamuck (1990)
Dennis the Menace (1985–94)
The Donna Reed Show (1986)
Fred: The Show (2012)
Hangin' In (1985)
Hunter Street (2017–21)
Mister Ed (1986)
The Monkees (1986–88)
Mork & Mindy (1991)
My Three Sons (1986)
The Patty Duke Show (1989–90)
Rank the Prank (2016)
Sabrina the Teenage Witch (2003–07)
So Little Time (2015)
The Wonder Years (1997–99)

Former acquired action series

American Ninja Warrior (2019)
Power Rangers Samurai (2011–12)
Power Rangers Megaforce (2013–14)
Power Rangers Dino Charge (2015–16) 
Power Rangers Ninja Steel (2017–18)
Power Rangers Beast Morphers (2019–2020)
Power Rangers Dino Fury (2021)

Former acquired drama series

The Adventures of Black Beauty (1982–87)
Adventures in Rainbow Country (1981–83)
Are You Afraid of the Dark? (1991–96; 1999–2000)
The Bureau of Magical Things (2018)
California Dreaming (2021)
Flipper (1990–96)
H2O: Just Add Water (2008–09)3
Land of the Lost (1995–97)
Lassie (1984–96)5
Matt and Jenny (1981–83)
Powerhouse (1984–86)
Ride (2017)
Ship to Shore (1996–97)
The Tomorrow People (1981–84; 1993–95)
Zoo Family (1986–88)

Former acquired variety series

3-2-1 Contact (September 5, 2000 – January 24, 2003)
Dusty's Treehouse (1980–84)
Going Great (October 1, 1983 – August 31, 1986)
Kidsworld (1990–92)
The Muppet Show (1994–96)
What Will They Think of Next! (1980–84)
The Shari Show (1987–88)
Spread Your Wings (1982)
Vegetable Soup (1981–82)
Vic's Vacant Lot (1984–85)
You Can't Do That on Television (1981–90)

Former acquired preschool series

44 Cats (2019)
Abby Hatcher (2018–22)
Adventures of the Little Koala (1987–93)
The Adventures of Timmy the Tooth (1995–96)
Bob the Builder (2001–04)
The Busy World of Richard Scarry (1995–2000)
Cappelli & Company (1993–94)
Corn & Peg (2019–20)
Deer Squad (2021)
Dino Dan (2010)
Grimm's Fairy Tale Classics (1992–95)
Franklin (1999–2004)
Franklin and Friends (2012)
Fred Penner's Place (1989–93)
Janosch's Dream World (1993–94)
Kipper (1999–2001)
LazyTown (2004–07)
Little Bear (1995–2003)
The Littl' Bits (1991–95)
The Little Twins (1998)
Maple Town (1987–89)
Maisy (1999–2001)
Max & Ruby (2003–19)
Maggie and the Ferocious Beast (2000–05)
Maya the Bee (1990–93)
Mike the Knight (2012)
Miss Spider's Sunny Patch Friends (2004–06)
Noozles (1988–93)
Olivia (2009)
Papa Beaver's Storytime (1994–97)
Peter Rabbit (2013–16)
Ricky Zoom (2019–20)
Rubbadubbers (2003–05)
Rupert (1995–98)
Rusty Rivets (2016–20)
Ryan's Mystery Playdate (2019–21)
Sharon, Lois & Bram's Elephant Show (1987–94)
Shining Time Station (2000)
Thomas & Friends (2017–19)
Tickety Toc (2012)
Today's Special (1982–91)
Top Wing (2017–20)
Tweenies (2003)
The World of David the Gnome (1988–95)
Wow! Wow! Wubbzy! (2006–10)
The Wubbulous World of Dr. Seuss (1996–2000)
Yo Gabba Gabba! (2007–11)

Programming blocks

Current programming blocks
Nick at Nite (July 1, 1985 – present)
Nick Jr.  (January 4, 1988 – present, name also used for a standalone channel since 2009)
That New Thursday Night  (September 23, 2021 – present)

Former programming blocks
Alpha Repertory Television Service (forerunner of A&E Network, April 12, 1981 – January 1985, became its own channel in 1985)
BubbleCast (February 5 – June 2001)
Cartoon Kablooey (1990–91; 1993–95)
Friday Night Nicktoons (January 5 – August 31, 2001; July 12, 2002 – February 27, 2004; September 24 – December 17, 2004)
Gotta See Saturdays (September 22, 2012 – April 27, 2013)
Kids Only Weekend (1985–89)
Hollywood Hang (September 14, 2009 – 2010)
Maxed-Out Mondays (December 5–26, 1994)
ME TV (February 19 – May 25, 2007)
Morning Mystery Pick (December 9, 2002 – January 3, 2003)
Nickamania (May 1 – July 4, 1993)
Nick Play Date (February 2, 2009 – February 29, 2012)
Nick: The Smart Place to Play (March 1, 2012 – May 2, 2014)
Nickelodeon Games & Sports (November 9, 1998 – February 20, 1999)
Nick Rewind (April 16 – August 20, 2006; September 24, 2006; December 31, 2006)
Nickelodeon SPLAT! (July 3 – October 2, 2004)
Nicktoons TV (May 16, 1998 – August 27, 2004)
Nickel-O-Zone (August 31, 1998 – 2000)
Nick Studio 10 (February 18 – June 17, 2013)
Noggin on Nickelodeon (2000–01)
Nick's Saturday Morning (May 21, 2005 – June 14, 2008)
Nick's Saturday Night (September 13, 2014 – November 20, 2021)
Nick in the Afternoon (1995–98)
The O Zone (1991–93) 
Prime Time Nicktoons (March 12 - September 17, 2004)
Saturday Morning Hang Zone with Lincoln Loud (February 25 – March 25, 2017)
Saturday Morning Nicktoons (2002–2004)
SLAM! (August 25, 2002 – March 2003)
Slime Time Live (January 24, 2000 – July 2, 2004)
Friday Night Slimetime (September 23, 2005 – March 24, 2006)
Slime Across America
Summer Slime Live
SNICK (August 15, 1992 – January 29, 2005)
Special Delivery (1980–93)
TEENick (March 6, 2001 – February 1, 2009, name currently used for the TeenNick channel)
TEENick Saturday Night (2005–06)
Throwback Thursday (June – August 2014)
U-Pick Live (October 14, 2002 – May 27, 2005)

Movie presentations
Star Channel (1979–80)
Nick's Family Picks (June 7, 1981 – 1982)
Muppet Matinee (July 10, 1993 – October 1, 1994)
Nickelodeon Sunday Movie Toons (2002–03)
Nick Flicks (aired in place of the SNICK block; July 7, 2001 – January 12, 2002, June 29 – September 7, 2002)

Seasonal programming blocks

Current Nick Holiday programming blocks
Thanksgiving Weekend on Nick (Thanksgiving: November 26, 2009 – present)
Nick Holidays (Christmas: December 25, 2009 – present)

Former Nick Holiday programming blocks
10 Nights of Frights (Halloween: October 21–31, 2011)
12 Days of Drake & Josh (New Year's Eve: December 20–31, 2009)
Crush Week (Valentine's Day: February 5, 2011 – February 8, 2015)
Ha! Ha! Holidays (Christmas: December 1, 2004 – December 25, 2008)
Halloween in September (Fall: September 5–21, 2009)
Nick New Years (New Year's Eve: December 31, 1993 – December 31, 1999)
Nick Horrors (Halloween: October 31, 2002 – October 31, 2009)
Nick or Treat! (Halloween: October 1, 1985 – October 31, 2002)
Nickmas (Christmas: December 2, 2002 – December 25, 2003)
Non-Stop Nicktoons Weekend (Thanksgiving: November 19, 1993 – November 30, 2002)
Shriek Week (Halloween: October 2001 – October 2002; October 2006; October 25–31, 2009)
Shriekin' Weekend (Halloween: October 27, 2005 – October 31, 2006)
Shocktober (Halloween: October 1–31, 2007)
Shocktober 2 (Halloween: October 1–31, 2008)
SNICKtoons Xmas Gift Pack (Christmas: December 1, 1994 – December 25, 1997)
Super Stuffed Nicksgiving Weekend (Thanksgiving: November 22, 2003 – November 29, 2009)
Super Stuffed Nicktoons Weekend (Thanksgiving: November 22, 2007 – November 30, 2008; November 23, 2013)
Super Stuffed Thanksgiving Weekend (Thanksgiving: November 21, 2011 – November 27, 2011)
Valentine's Day Mushfest (Valentine's Day: February 14, 1993 – February 14, 1996)

Former Summer programming blocks
Henry & June's Nicktoons Summer Jam (July 5 – September 3, 1999)
Jam Packed June (June 1–30, 2008)
Nicktoons Summer Beach House (May 27, 2002 – September 4, 2003)
The Nicktoons Summer Film Festival (June 11 – September 3, 2004)
Non-Stop 5 at 5 (July 1 – August 28, 2008)
Sizzling Summer (July 1 – September 1, 2008)
Summer Invasion (June 17, 2012 – 2013)
Summer on Nick (July 22, 2004 – September 26, 2007)
Summer PickNick (May 27, 2002 – September 4, 2003)
SpongeBob's Nicktoons Summer Splash (June 28, 2000 – September 3, 2001)
Surf and Burp (June 30, 2006 – September 19, 2008)

See also
Nick Jr. on CBS
List of programs broadcast by Nick at Nite
List of programs broadcast by Nicktoons
List of programs broadcast by Noggin
List of programs broadcast by TeenNick
List of programs broadcast by Nick Jr.
List of Nickelodeon original films
List of Nickelodeon short films

Notes

References

Programs broadcast by Nickelodeon, List of
Nickelodeon original programming
Nickelodeon
Programs broadcast